Boronia forsteri is a plant in the citrus family Rutaceae and is endemic to mountain ranges in central Queensland, Australia. It is an erect shrub with many branches, simple leaves with a densely hairy, pale underside, and pink, four-petalled flowers.

Description
The lower surface of the leaf is a much paler colour than the upper surface and has a dense layer of hairs. The eight stamens are hairy.

Taxonomy and naming
Boronia forsteri was first formally described in 1999 by Marco F. Duretto and the description was published in the journal Austrobaileya from a specimen collected near the property "Glenhaugton". The specific epithet (forsteri) honours the Australian botanist  Paul Irwin Forster.

Distribution and habitat
This boronia grows in woodland and forest in sandstone country in the Chesterton, Carnarvon and Expedition Ranges and in the Central Highlands of Queensland.

Conservation
Boronia forsteri is classed as "least concern" under the Queensland Government Nature Conservation Act 1992.

References 

forsteri
Flora of Queensland
Plants described in 1999
Taxa named by Marco Duretto